Yelino is a rural locality (a village) in Lyakhovskoye Rural Settlement, Melenkovsky District, Vladimir Oblast, Russia. The population was 50 as of 2010. There are 4 streets. It is 176 miles(283 kilometers) east of Moscow.

Geography 
Yelino is located on the Oka River, 39 km northeast of Melenki (the district's administrative centre) by road. Anokhino is the nearest rural locality.

References 

Rural localities in Melenkovsky District